Lí is a Chinese surname. It mostly appears in Central and South China (including Hong Kong and Macao) where it is transliterated as Lai or Lei (from Cantonese).

It is around the 81st most common in Mainland China.

In Vietnam, it is spelled Lê and is one of the four most common surnames among ethnic Vietnamese people.

It is listed 262nd in the Song dynasty classic Hundred Family Surnames.

Some Hlai people in Hainan Island also use Lí as a surname.

Origin
Around the Yangtze River, any Jiuli (九黎) people got surname Li (黎) as a tribal name. In Ancient China, descendants of Shaohao were surnamed Li on Licheng County (黎城). During the Xia dynasty, descendants of Emperor Yao were surnamed Li (黎) in Licheng County (黎城).

In Vietnam, some Chinese Li (黎) families changed their surname to Vietnamese Hà or Hồ (胡).

Notable people

 Leon Lai (黎明), actor and Cantopop singer
 Li Yuanhong, 4th president of the Republic of China
 Jimmy Lai, founder of Apple Daily
 Gigi Lai, singer and TVB actress
 Humberto Lay (黎孙), Peruvian pastor and politician
 Lai Lok-yi, Hong Kong singer
 Lai Man-Wai, film director
 Newton Lai (黎漢持), Hong Kong actor
 Wayne Lai, Hong Kong actor
 Li Zhaohuan (黎照寰; 1898–1969) President of Shanghai Jiao Tong University
 The eight Li brothers of Xiangtan, including:
 Li Jinxi (1890–1978)
 Li Jinhui (1891–1967)
 Chin Yang Lee (Li Jinyang; 1915–2018), author of novel The Flower Drum Song

See also
 Lê, Vietnamese version

References

Chinese-language surnames
Individual Chinese surnames